Culex obscurus is a species of mosquito in the genus Culex.

Distribution
Indonesia, Malaysia

References

obscurus
Insects described in 1908
Diptera of Asia